Joseph John Martin (November 21, 1833 – December 18, 1900) was a Republican U.S. Congressman from North Carolina, United States between 1879 and 1881.

Born in Williamston in Martin County, North Carolina, Martin attended Williamston Academy and then studied law. He was admitted to the bar in 1859 and became the prosecuting attorney of Martin County. He was elected solicitor for North Carolina's second judicial district in 1868 and was re-elected to that post in 1874. Martin was a member of the Republican party and a delegate to the 1876 Republican National Convention.

In 1878, Martin was elected to the U.S. House, defeating incumbent Democrat Jesse Johnson Yeates. Although Martin served most of his two-year term, Yeates successfully contested the election and unseated Martin on January 29, 1881, two months before the expiration of Martin's term.

After leaving Congress, Martin returned to the practice of law in Tarboro, North Carolina; he was that town's postmaster from 1897 until his death in 1900. Martin is buried in Woodlawn Cemetery in Williamston, his hometown.

External links

1833 births
1900 deaths
Republican Party members of the United States House of Representatives from North Carolina
North Carolina postmasters
People from Tarboro, North Carolina
19th-century American politicians